Steven Funaki Adams (born 20 July 1993) is a New Zealand professional basketball player for the Memphis Grizzlies of the National Basketball Association (NBA). After playing one season with his hometown team, the Wellington Saints, in 2011, Adams moved to the United States in 2012 to play college basketball for Pittsburgh.

Adams was selected by the Oklahoma City Thunder with the 12th overall pick in the 2013 NBA draft. He was the Thunder's primary starting center for six consecutive seasons. In November 2020, after seven years in Oklahoma City, Adams was traded to the New Orleans Pelicans. In August 2021, he was dealt to the Memphis Grizzlies.

Early life 
Steven Adams was born in Rotorua, New Zealand, to a Tongan mother and an English father. His father, Sid Adams, served in the Royal Navy and later settled in New Zealand where he fathered 18 children with five women. Two of his half-sisters are athletes: Dame Valerie Adams is a dual Olympic gold medallist and four-time world champion shot-putter and Lisa Adams is a para athlete who has won gold at the Paralympics in shot-put. His brothers, Warren and Sid Jr., had careers in the New Zealand National Basketball League.

Sid Adams was in his sixties when his youngest child Steven was born, and Sid died in 2006 of stomach cancer. Adams has identified his father's death as one of the defining events of his life. In a 2012 interview, Adams recalled: When I lost my dad, that was a big hit for me. I didn't have that parental guidance, and I kind of took advantage of it because I was a stupid idiot. I decided not to go to school a couple of times, go when I felt like it. I always lied to my brothers and sisters. They'd ask: 'Are you going to school?' I'd say 'yeah'. They eventually found out.

After the death of his father, his brother Warren rescued him from the streets of Rotorua and took him to Wellington. Warren took responsibility for Adams and introduced him to Wellington basketball legend Kenny McFadden. McFadden accepted Adams into his basketball academy, and Warren enrolled him in Scots College. The only rule McFadden had for Adams was that he had to attend school every day if he wanted to play basketball. While there was pressure for Adams to turn professional straight out of high school because it was believed he would never be able to qualify for the NCAA, Adams did well at Scots College and passed through the NCAA Clearinghouse after graduating from Scots in December 2011.

Preparatory school and college
After graduating from Scots College in December 2011, Adams enrolled at Notre Dame Preparatory School, a well-known basketball prep school in Fitchburg, Massachusetts, for one semester. It was arranged only so he could acclimate himself to American basketball before enrolling at Pittsburgh in June 2012.

In his lone season at Pittsburgh, Adams was named the Big East Preseason Rookie of the Year and earned Big East All-Rookie Team honours. He started all 32 games during the 2012–13 season and averaged 7.2 points, 6.3 rebounds and 2.0 blocks per game.

On 2 April 2013, Adams declared for the NBA draft, forgoing his final three years of college eligibility.

Professional career

Wellington Saints (2011)
In 2011, Adams played for the Wellington Saints of the National Basketball League. He went unpaid by the Saints in order to keep his college eligibility. He was named the New Zealand NBL Rookie of the Year and helped the Saints win the championship. In 15 games for the Saints, he averaged 5.5 points and 4.1 rebounds per game.

Oklahoma City Thunder (2013–2020)

2013–16: Early years

On 27 June 2013, Adams was selected with the 12th overall pick in the 2013 NBA draft by the Oklahoma City Thunder, becoming the first New Zealander to be selected in the first round of an NBA draft. He also became the first player out of Pittsburgh to be selected in the first round since 1999 when Vonteego Cummings was selected by the Indiana Pacers with the 26th overall pick. On 12 July 2013, he signed his rookie scale contract with the Thunder. In his NBA debut on 30 October 2013, Adams recorded two points, three rebounds, one assist and three fouls in 18½ minutes off the bench against the Utah Jazz. On 8 November, in just his fifth NBA game, Adams recorded 17 points and 10 rebounds in a 119–110 win over the Detroit Pistons. He failed to surpass either mark for the rest of the regular season. He appeared in 81 games (20 starts) and averaged 3.3 points, 4.1 rebounds (9th among NBA rookies) and 0.70 blocks (9th among NBA rookies) in 14.8 minutes. In Game 6 of the Thunder's second round playoff series against the Los Angeles Clippers, Adams recorded 10 points and a season-high 11 rebounds. The Thunder reached the Western Conference Finals, where they were defeated by the San Antonio Spurs in six games. At the conclusion of the 2013–14 season, Adams earned NBA All-Rookie Second Team honours.

On 16 November 2014, Adams recorded a career-high six blocks in a 69–65 loss to the Houston Rockets. On 25 December 2014, he recorded a season-high 16 points and a then-career-high 15 rebounds in a 114–106 win over the San Antonio Spurs. On 21 January 2015, he recorded a career-high 20 rebounds in a 105–103 overtime win over the Washington Wizards. Adams missed 11 straight games over February and March with a broken ring finger on his right hand. He scored a season-high 16 points three times during the 2014–15 season.

On 10 January 2016, Adams tied his career high of 17 points in a 115–110 loss to the Portland Trail Blazers. On 12 April 2016, in the Thunder's regular-season finale, Adams had another 17-point performance in a 102–98 loss to the San Antonio Spurs. In Game 2 of the Thunder's second-round playoff series against the Spurs, Adams recorded 12 points and 17 rebounds. In Game 4, he scored 16 points. Adams helped the Thunder advance to the Western Conference Finals for the second time in three years, where in Game 1 against the Golden State Warriors, he recorded 16 points and 12 rebounds. Despite going up 3–1 in the series, the Thunder were defeated in seven games by the Warriors.

2016–20: Increase in production 
On 31 October 2016, Adams signed a four-year, $100 million contract extension with the Thunder. On 22 November 2016, Adams scored a career-high 20 points in a 111–109 loss to the Los Angeles Lakers. He surpassed that mark on 9 December 2016, scoring 24 points in a 102–99 loss to the Houston Rockets. His 17 points in the first half were a career high for a half.

On 1 December 2017, Adams scored a career-high 27 points on perfect shooting from the field and the free throw line to help the Thunder beat the Minnesota Timberwolves 111–107. On 2 February 2018, he had 23 points and 12 rebounds in a 114–100 loss to the New Orleans Pelicans, reaching 3,000 career points. He joined Kevin Durant and Serge Ibaka as the only Thunder players with at least 3,000 career points and 350 career blocks. On 13 February 2018, Adams recorded 22 points and 17 rebounds in a 120–112 loss to the Cleveland Cavaliers. Twelve of his 17 rebounds against the Cavaliers were offensive, becoming the first ever Thunder player to grab 12 offensive rebounds in a game. In Game 6 of the Thunder's first-round playoff series against the Utah Jazz, Adams recorded 19 points and 16 rebounds in a 96–91 loss, as the Thunder bowed out of the playoffs with a 4–2 defeat.

On 17 November 2018, Adams scored 26 points in a 110–100 win over the Phoenix Suns. On 14 December, he recorded 26 points and 14 rebounds in a 109–98 loss to the Denver Nuggets. On 19 December, he recorded 20 points and a career-high 23 rebounds in a 132–113 win over the Sacramento Kings. On 3 March 2019, he recorded 13 points and 22 rebounds in a 99–95 win over the Memphis Grizzlies.

New Orleans Pelicans (2020–2021)
On 24 November 2020, Adams was traded to the New Orleans Pelicans. As part of the deal, he signed a two year, $35 million extension with the Pelicans. On 29 January 2021, Adams scored only 4 points, but grabbed a season high 20 rebounds in a 131–126 win over the Milwaukee Bucks. On 4 March, Adams scored a season high 15 points in a 103–93 loss to the Miami Heat.

Memphis Grizzlies (2021–present)
On 7 August 2021, Adams was traded to the Memphis Grizzlies. On 23 October, Adams scored a season high 17 points, grabbed 9 rebounds, and recorded 5 assists in a 120–114 win over the Los Angeles Clippers. On 6 December, Adams helped lead the Grizzlies to a fifth straight win while tying his season high with 17 points scored, alongside grabbing 16 rebounds, in a 105–90 victory over the Miami Heat. On 26 February 2022, Adams scored 12 points and grabbed a season high 21 rebounds, during a 116–110 win against the Chicago Bulls. 

On 2 October 2022, Adams signed a two-year, $25.2 million contract extension with the Grizzlies. On 18 January 2023, he scored a game-winning tip-in in a 115–114 win over the Cleveland Cavaliers. On 22 January, Adams suffered a right knee injury during a 112–110 loss to the Phoenix Suns. Two days later, the Grizzlies announced that he was diagnosed with a PCL sprain in his right knee and would be sidelined for three-to-five weeks. On 9 March, the Grizzlies announced that Adams had received a stem cell injection the day before and would be re-evaluated in four weeks, ending his regular season run.

Career statistics

NBA

Regular season

|-
| style="text-align:left;"| 
| style="text-align:left;"| Oklahoma City
| 81 || 20 || 14.8 || .503 || — || .581 || 4.1 || .5 || .5 || .7 || 3.3
|-
| style="text-align:left;"| 
| style="text-align:left;"| Oklahoma City
| 70 || 67 || 25.3 || .544 || .000 || .502 || 7.5 || .9 || .5 || 1.2 || 7.7
|-
| style="text-align:left;"| 
| style="text-align:left;"| Oklahoma City
| 80 || 80 || 25.2 || .613 || — || .582 || 6.7 || .8 || .5 || 1.1 || 8.0
|-
| style="text-align:left;"| 
| style="text-align:left;"| Oklahoma City
| 80 || 80 ||  29.9 || .571 || .000 || .611 || 7.7 || 1.1 || 1.1 || 1.0 || 11.3
|-
| style="text-align:left;"| 
| style="text-align:left;"| Oklahoma City
| 76 || 76 || 32.7 || .629 || .000 || .559 || 9.0 || 1.2 || 1.2 || 1.0 || 13.9
|-
| style="text-align:left;"| 
| style="text-align:left;"| Oklahoma City
| 80 || 80 ||  33.4  || .595 || .000 || .500 || 9.5 || 1.6 || 1.5 || 1.0 || 13.9
|-
| style="text-align:left;"| 
| style="text-align:left;"| Oklahoma City
| 63 || 63 || 26.7 || .592 || .333 || .582 || 9.3 || 2.3 || .8 || 1.1 || 10.9
|-
| style="text-align:left;"| 
| style="text-align:left;"| New Orleans
| 58 || 58 || 27.7 || .614 || .000 || .444 || 8.9 || 1.9 || .9 || .7 || 7.6
|-
| style="text-align:left;"| 
| style="text-align:left;"| Memphis
| 76 || 75 || 26.3 || .547 || .000 || .543 || 10.0 || 3.4 || .9 || .8 || 6.9
|-
| style="text-align:left;"| 
| style="text-align:left;"| Memphis
| 42 || 42 || 27.0 || .597 || .000 || .364 || 11.5 || 2.3 || .9 || 1.1 || 8.6
|- class="sortbottom"
| colspan= "2" style="text-align:center;"| Career
| 706 || 641 || 26.8 || .587 || .067 || .536 || 8.2 || 1.5 || .9 || 1.0 || 9.2

Playoffs

|-
| style="text-align:left;"| 2014
| style="text-align:left;"| Oklahoma City
| 18 || 0 || 18.4 || .689 || — || .348 || 4.1 || .2 || .1 || 1.3 || 3.9
|-
| style="text-align:left;"| 2016
| style="text-align:left;"| Oklahoma City
| 18 || 18 || 30.7 || .613 || .000 || .630 || 9.5 || .7 || .5 || .8 || 10.1
|-
| style="text-align:left;"| 2017
| style="text-align:left;"| Oklahoma City
| 5 || 5 || 31.4 || .643 || — || .364 || 6.8 || 1.4 || 1.2 || 1.8 || 8.0
|-
| style="text-align:left;"| 2018
| style="text-align:left;"| Oklahoma City
| 6 || 6 || 33.4 || .587 || — || .692 || 7.5 || 1.5 || .7 || .7 || 10.5
|- 
| style="text-align:left;"| 2019
| style="text-align:left;"| Oklahoma City
| 5 || 5 || 31.8 || .667 || .000 || .375 || 7.2 || 1.4 || 1.0 || 1.0 || 11.5
|- 
| style="text-align:left;"| 2020
| style="text-align:left;"| Oklahoma City
| 7 || 7 || 30.0 || .596 || .000 || .450 || 11.6 || 1.3 || .6 || .3 || 10.1
|- 
| style="text-align:left;"| 2022
| style="text-align:left;"| Memphis
| 7 || 5 || 16.3 || .429 || — || .545 || 6.4 || 2.1 || .1 || .1 || 3.4
|- class="sortbottom"
| colspan= "2" style="text-align:center;"| Career
| 66 || 46 || 26.1 || .614 || .000 || .535 || 7.4 || 1.0 || .5 || .9 || 7.7

College

|-
|style="text-align:left;"|2012–13
|style="text-align:left;"|Pittsburgh
|32||32||23.4||.571||.000||.443||6.3||0.6||0.7||2.0||7.2
|}

Personal life
Adams enjoys playing video games; he says Dota 2 and Smite are his favourites. He also often posted his Fortnite and online Chess wins on Instagram between 2018 and 2020. 

In 2018, his autobiography Steven Adams: My Life, My Fight was released, co-written by childhood friend and journalist Madeleine Chapman.

Adams is generally well respected around the league for his sense of humour, down to earth personality and humility. On 14 December 2018, playing against the Denver Nuggets he received praise for catching his opponent Mason Plumlee after Plumlee jumped to contest a layup and fell over Adams. Despite having an uncontested shot, Adams chose to drop the ball and catch Plumlee, preventing a serious injury.  On 12 February 2022, Plumlee displayed a lack of gratitude for this, shoving Adams to the floor and throwing the basketball at him upon receiving a foul call he deemed to be unreasonable. Despite this, Adams did not react, and Plumlee received a technical foul for the altercation. 

Adams revealed that he was a fan of Korean singer and actress IU.

An interview with Adams was featured in the 2022 documentary film Dame Valerie Adams: More than Gold, where he discusses the childhood of his sister, Olympic shot putter Valerie Adams.

References

External links

Steven Adams at pittsburghpanthers.com
"Steven Adams in 'The Kiwi Way' – how a boy from Rotorua made it to the NBA" at stuff.co.nz
"Steven Adams’ former coach discusses his unique path to the NBA" at foxsports.com
"Steven Adams is a big man from a big family, and he’s making a huge impression on the NBA" at dailytelegraph.com.au

1993 births
Living people
Centers (basketball)
Memphis Grizzlies players
National Basketball Association players from New Zealand
New Orleans Pelicans players
New Zealand men's basketball players
New Zealand expatriate basketball people in the United States
New Zealand people of English descent
New Zealand sportspeople of Tongan descent
Oklahoma City Thunder draft picks
Oklahoma City Thunder players
People educated at Scots College, Wellington
Pittsburgh Panthers men's basketball players
Sportspeople from Rotorua
Sportspeople from Wellington City
Wellington Saints players